Chapman is a non-alcoholic drink, usually red in colour. Often referred to as a non-alcoholic punch, it is traditionally made with a mix of Fanta, Sprite, Cucumber, Lemon, Grenadine and Angostura bitters and is traditionally served in a large mug with ice and a few slices of cucumber. It is often described as Nigeria's favourite drink and though predominantly served without alcohol, it can also be served with a hint of vodka or rum.

History 
It is believed that the cocktail originated at a local bar in Ikoyi Club, Lagos, Nigeria. The drink was created by Samuel Alamutu a bartender  at the country club who was asked to make something special for his favourite customer named Chapman.

Ingredients and variations 
Chapman is probably Nigeria's most famous and favourite drink and it is served in many bars, clubs, restaurants and special occasions in the country and is increasing in popularity across West Africa. 

While there is no approved standard recipe, a Chapman drink will always include bitters, lemon, lime and cucumber.

References 

Non-alcoholic mixed drinks
Nigerian drinks